Nico Müller (born 2 November 1993) is a German Olympic weightlifter. He competed at the 2016 Summer Olympics in the men's 77 kg weight class. He finished in 10th place.

Results

References

External links 
 
 
 
 

1993 births
Living people
German male weightlifters
Weightlifters at the 2016 Summer Olympics
Olympic weightlifters of Germany
Weightlifters at the 2010 Summer Youth Olympics
European Weightlifting Championships medalists
Weightlifters at the 2020 Summer Olympics
21st-century German people